The 2011 Four Continents Figure Skating Championships was an international figure skating competition in the 2010–11 season. It was held at the Taipei Arena in Taipei, Taiwan on February 15–20. Medals were awarded in the disciplines of men's singles, ladies' singles, pair skating, and ice dancing.

Qualification
The competition was open to skaters from a non-European member nation of the International Skating Union who reached the age of 15 by July 1, 2010. Each country may send up to three entries per discipline.

The corresponding competition for European skaters was the 2011 European Figure Skating Championships.

Entries

Schedule
 Thursday, February 17
 16:00 Ice dancing: Short dance
 19:30 Pairs: Short program
 Friday, February 18
 12:00 Men: Short program
 16:45 Pairs: Free skating
 20:00 Ice dancing: Free dance
 Saturday, February 19
 13:00 Ladies: Short program
 18:00 Men: Free skating
 Sunday, February 20
 11:30 Ladies: Free skating
 17:30 Exhibition

Results

Men
Daisuke Takahashi won the event for the second time.

Ladies

Pairs
Pang / Tong won the event for the fifth time.

Ice dancing
After winning the short program, Virtue / Moir had to withdraw because of an injury to Virtue.

 WD: Withdrew

References

External links

 
 Official site
 ISU site

Four Continents Figure Skating Championships
Four Continents
Four Continents
Four Continents 2011